"Games Without Frontiers" is a song written and recorded by English rock musician Peter Gabriel. It was released on his 1980 self-titled solo album, where it included backing vocals by Kate Bush. The song's lyrics are interpreted as a commentary on war and international diplomacy being like children's games. The video includes film clips of Olympic events and scenes from the 1951 educational film Duck and Cover, which used a cartoon turtle to instruct US schoolchildren on what to do in case of nuclear attack. This forlorn imagery tends to reinforce the song's anti-war theme. Two versions of the music video were initially created for the song, followed by a third one made in 2004.

The single became Gabriel's first top-10 hit in the United Kingdom, peaking at No. 4, and – tied with 1986's "Sledgehammer" – his highest-charting song in the United Kingdom. It peaked at No. 7 in Canada, but only at No. 48 in the United States. The B-side of the single consisted of two tracks combined into one: "Start" and "I Don't Remember".

Background
Gabriel's first two solo albums were distributed in the US by Atlantic Records, but they rejected his third album (which contained this track), telling Gabriel he was committing "commercial suicide". Atlantic dropped him but tried to buy the album back when "Games Without Frontiers" took off in the UK and started getting airplay in the US. At that point Gabriel wanted nothing to do with Atlantic, and let Mercury Records distribute the album in America.

Teams representing a town or city in one of the participating countries would compete in games of skill, often while dressed in bizarre costumes. While some games were simple races, others allowed one team to obstruct another. The British version was titled It's a Knockout—words that Gabriel mentions in the lyrics.

"It seemed to have several layers to it", Gabriel observed. "I just began playing in a somewhat light-hearted fashion – 'Hans and Lottie ...' – so it looked, on the surface, as just kids. The names themselves are meaningless, but they do have certain associations with them. So it's almost like a little kids' activity room. Underneath that, you have the TV programme [and the] sort of nationalism, territorialism, competitiveness that underlies all that assembly of jolly people."

The lyrics "Adolf builds a bonfire/Enrico plays with it" echo lines from Evelyn Waugh's V-J Day diary ("Randolph built a bonfire and Auberon fell into it").

Musically, "Games Without Frontiers" opens with a mixture of acoustic and electronic percussion accompanied by a countoff. Synth bass and an angular slide guitar figure enter with Kate Bush's vocals, creating a "dark sonic environment" as described by AllMusic reviewer Steve Huey. Following the final chorus, the song segues into a percussion breakdown punctuated by synth and guitar effects.

Gabriel's 1991 performance of the song from the Netherlands was beamed via satellite to Wembley Arena in England as part of "The Simple Truth" concert for Kurdish refugees.

Radio version, videos
The album version includes the line "Whistling tunes we piss on the goons in the jungle" after the second verse and before the second chorus. This was replaced for the single with a more radio-friendly repeat of the line "Whistling tunes we're kissing baboons in the jungle" from the first chorus. This version was also included in the initial copies of the Shaking the Tree compilation.

There are originally two versions of the music video in existence, one which features shots of children sitting round a dining table, and another which replaces those shots with stock footage from the films Duck and Cover, Human Grace, My Japan and Live and Let Live, and excerpts from the video artworks Active Site, Spiral and Grid by the Israeli artist Michal Rovner. 

A third version of the video was created in 2004, when Gabriel himself made the decision to alter the first version for release on the DVD "Play", which compiled 23 music videos from his solo career. This altered version of the video is the only one that Gabriel now considers to be official, although the original can still be found online, sourced from TV broadcasts in the 80s and 90s.

Reception
Record World said that "A creative percussion / keyboard / vocal mix and unique tempo shifts make this as attractive as it is interesting."

Musicians
 Peter Gabriel – vocals; synthesizer; synth bass; whistles
 David Rhodes – guitar
 Jerry Marotta – drums; percussion
 Larry Fast – synthesizer; synth bass
 Kate Bush – backing vocals
 Steve Lillywhite – whistles
 Hugh Padgham – whistles

Chart performance
"Games Without Frontiers" reached the top 10 in Canada and the United Kingdom. In spite of the song's very modest chart showing in the US, it did quite well in Chicago, where it spent two weeks at No. 5 on the survey of superstation WLS-FM-AM and ranked at No. 87 for the year.

Weekly charts

Year-end charts

See also
 List of anti-war songs

References

External links
 

1979 songs
1980 singles
Anti-war songs
Macaronic songs
Peter Gabriel songs
Song recordings produced by Steve Lillywhite
Songs written by Peter Gabriel
British new wave songs
Charisma Records singles
Music videos directed by David Mallet (director)
Censorship of music
Quizzes and game shows in popular culture
Songs about television